What Waits Below is a science-fiction adventure film (initially released under the title Secrets of the Phantom Caverns) released in 1984. Directed by Don Sharp, produced by the Adams Apple Film Company, the film runs for 88 minutes and stars Robert Powell, Timothy Bottoms, and Lisa Blount. The tagline for the video release of the film was "Underground, no-one can hear you die".

Plot

The US military is running a test for a special type of radio transmitter, to be used to communicate with submarines, in a deep system of caves in Central America. When the signal from one of the transmitters suddenly disappears, a team of soldiers led by Major Elbert Stevens (Bottoms) and cave specialists led by Rupert 'Wolf' Wolfsen (Powell) including scientist Leslie Peterson (Blount) are sent in to find out what happened.

Exploring deep underground, they stumble upon a tribe of albino cave-dwellers who have apparently been isolated from the rest of the world for thousands of years. The cave-dwellers are hurt by radio frequencies and are able to see in infra-red frequencies, tracking the explorers by their body heat.

Cast
Robert Powell – Rupert 'Wolf' Wolfsen 
Timothy Bottoms – Major Elbert Stevens 
Lisa Blount – Leslie Peterson 
Richard Johnson – Ben Gannon 
Anne Heywood – Frieda Shelley

Production
Sandy Howard produced the film with special effects designer Robert Bailey. "Sandy came to me and said, 'Bob, how'd you like to work on a picture that'll gel you out of those darkrooms you've been working in on all those effects?' So I said, ‘Hey, that sounds great'."

Howard wanted to shoot the film in a real cavern to give the film "a special beauty and grandeur that has taken over one million years to develop, and which no Hollywood set could ever dare hope to recreate."

It was the first American film for Robert Powell, who was cast in October 1983. Powell described it as more than "another pulp movie. It's a romp, a more physical movie, and fun stuff for an actor."

Filming
Filming started August 1983. Principal photography for the film took place in a former limestone quarry and in natural caves. It shot at Cumberland Caverns for about two weeks, then another two weeks were shot at Cathedral Caverns in Alabama. Several days were spent filming at Fall Creek Falls, too.

Lisa Blount said "We would go into the caverns before dawn, stay there all day, and 
come out at night, so we never saw the sunlight, except for Sunday. "

Accident
Production was briefly halted in late August when carbon monoxide produced by generators in the Cathedral Caverns location sent at least 17 people, including Sharp, to the hospital.

Blout recalled the accident happened while her character was captured and tied up on a rise inside the cavern. "All the extras, as the Lemurians, were out in front of me, and I watched all these people just start silently falling over, fainting, as this wave of carbon monoxide came at them," she said.

Blout said "All hell broke loose. We had little golf carts for transportation, and it was an immediate emergency situation of getting out, but these carts didn’t go that fast. We had very sick people, and it was a matter of determining who got in the first car out — youngest ones first. It was just total chaos. There were sixty people who went to the hospital."

Blout said the cause was "one of those technical problems where the generator running everything backed up and started shooting fumes back into the cave. We had to shut down for a few days because of that, but we got through it."

Production wrapped in late October 1983.

Co-producer and special effects designer Robert D. Bailey said "Frankly, I underestimated the difficulty of shooting in the caverns. If I had it to do over again, I would not attempt to do such extensive filming underground."

Making the film was an unhappy experience for director Don Sharp. He said people were frequently fired during the shoot and he was never given what he was promised in terms of effects. "It wasn't very good," said Sharp, "It wasn't a very good cast." Sharp said he told the producer he felt the film was awful and he left after shooting without taking part in editing.

Release
What Waits Below was released on VHS in the United States in November 1985.

References

Notes

External links 

1984 films
1984 horror films
1980s science fiction films
British science fiction horror films
British science fiction action films
Films directed by Don Sharp
1984 action films
Films shot in Alabama
1980s English-language films
1980s British films